Jews have been present in El Salvador since the early 19th century, starting with Sephardic Jews and continuing with the arrival of refugees from Europe during World War II. El Salvador has the second largest community in Central America, the majority established in San Salvador, which is the second city with the most Jews in Central America, behind Panama City.

History of the Jews in El Salvador
Already since colonial times there is a record of Jews in Latin America, in El Salvador there is a record of several Jewish immigrations from Portugal, after the independence of El Salvador, it is believed that the first Jewish immigrant was Bernardo Haas, born in Alsace. Subsequently, the first documented German Jew arrived in the country in 1888, according to academic Jessica Alpert. France and Central Europe were the main countries of origin of this contemporary Jewish migration.

Business partnership with Catholic conservative landlords during the 1930s hampered Jewish security, but the situation improved after World War II, and many Jews arrived, many thanks to the work of Colonel Castellanos who saved over 40,000 Jews from Central Europe by giving them visas and Salvadoran nationality. On Sept. 11, 1948, El Salvador recognized the State of Israel, and in 1956 the Instituto Cultural El Salvador-Israel was founded.

Jerusalén is a municipality in the La Paz department of El Salvador. It was named by the Cordova family, more specifically by Juan Cordova. They were Sephardic Jews who were expelled from Spain. Other Sephardic Jews are Escalante's, Figueroas, Figueiras, Perla, Galeas, Galeanos, Gomar, López,  Perez, Taher and Taheri among others, some of them became members and founders of the Seventh-day Adventist church in the area of Morazan.

Right before the Salvadoran Civil War, the Jewish community was actively involved in organizing a Zionist Organization, of which Ernesto Liebes and Carlos Bernhard were its main leaders.  Members of the community were also involved. According to American writer Jane Hunter in her book Israeli Foreign Policy: South Africa and Central America, in facilitating the sale of arms from Israel in El Salvador, particularly the sale of 18 Dassault Ouragan jetfighters aircraft in 1973, of which Liebes was perceived by guerrilla groups as the primary representative.

Prior to the Civil War, there were about 300 Jews in El Salvador, most of whom lived in the capital. During the Civil War many Jews left the country after the kidnap and murder of a community leader and Israeli Honorary Consul for cultural relations Ernesto Liebes by the RN-FARN, the armed wing of the RN, one of the groups that formed the FMLN. 

The Comunidad Israelita de El Salvador was established in 1944 with a Jewish community center opening in 1945 and a synagogue in 1950 . The country has now 1 synagogue.

Notable Salvadoran Jews include: Ricardo Freund, businessman and current President of the Comunidad Israelita de El Salvador; Claudio Kahn, businessman and past president of the same organization.

1990s

The signing of peace treaties in 1992 led to the return of several Jewish couples with children who had moved elsewhere during the Salvadoran civil war. A new community center and synagogue were inaugurated in the past decade.  The Comunidad Israelita de El Salvador holds services on Friday, Shabbat morning, and on holy days. For Pesach, Rosh Hashannah, Sukkot, Channukah, Purim and Yom Haatzmaut the women's committee organizes meals for the community to share and celebrate together.

University students have a Jewish students association, EJES (Estudiantes Judíos de El Salvador), and a Zionist group, FUSLA (Federación de Universitarios Sionistas de Latinoamérica), both of which are active throughout the year. For adults, the community offers different educational classes in Hebrew and other topics of interest. The "Chevra of Women" offers a course in Jewish cooking, and there is a monthly Jewish bulletin called el Kehilatón, which advertises synagogue events. The Noar Shelanu youth movement, to which about 30 children age 8–18 belong, meets weekly. The kindergarten for young children also meets weekly. Two emissaries teach Hebrew and Judaism.

Relations with Israel

In 2006, El Salvador announced plans to move the embassy to Tel Aviv where the rest of the embassies are located. This has been met by controversy, with many believing this decision to be under the political influence of the Arab community and the then President, Tony Saca, who is of Christian Arab descent.

Anti-Semitism

During the Salvadoran Civil War, American journalist Joan Didion wrote in Salvador that 

During the civil war, members of the Nationalist Republican Alliance opposed to Álvaro Magaña's presidency called him "the little Jew".

See also
José Castellanos Contreras, diplomat who provided Salvadoran nationality papers to tens of thousands of Jews during World War II.
Bernard Salomon Lewinsky, doctor and medical researcher, father of Monica Lewinsky, was born in El Salvador.

References and notes

Beker, Avi. "El Salvador." Jewish Communities of the World. Lerner Publications Company, Minneapolis, 1998.
"El Salvador." Encyclopaedia Judaica.
"El Salvador." la Unión Judía de Congregaciones de Latinoamérica y el Caribe
Zaidner, Michael. Jewish Travel Guide. Vallentine Mitchell, Portland, 2000.

External links
Jewish Virtual Library
Antisemitism Worldwide 2000/1

El Salvador
El Salvador
History
Jewish